Mongolian numerals are numerals developed from Tibetan numerals and used in conjunction with the Mongolian and Clear script. They are still used on Mongolian tögrög banknotes.

The main sources of reference for Mongolian numerals are mathematical and philosophical works of Janj khutugtu A.Rolbiidorj (1717-1766) and  D.Injinaash (1704-1788). Rolbiidorj exercises with numerals of up to 1066, the last number which he called “setgeshgui” or “unimaginable” referring to the concept of infinity.  Injinaash works with numerals of up to 1059. Of these two scholars, the Rolbiidorj’s numerals, their names and sequencing are commonly accepted and used today, for example, in the calculations and documents pertaining to the Mongolian Government budget.

Base numbers
Numbers from 1 to 9 are referred to as "dan", meaning "simple".

Extended numbers

References

Numerals
Graphemes